Mika Pekka Savilahti (born 31 March 1963 in Tampere) is a Finnish sprint canoeist who competed in the mid-1980s. He was eliminated in the semifinals in both the K-2 500 m and the K-4 1000 m events at the 1984 Summer Olympics in Los Angeles.

References
 Sports-Reference.com profile

1963 births
Living people
Canoeists from Tampere
Canoeists at the 1984 Summer Olympics
Finnish male canoeists
Olympic canoeists of Finland